Thomas Aldrich D.D. was a priest and academic in the sixteenth century.

The son of John Aldrich, MP he was born in Norwich. He was educated at Corpus Christi College, Cambridge, becoming Fellow in 1562; and Master from 1570 until 1573.  He was Rector of Hadleigh, Suffolk and Archdeacon of Sudbury from 1570 until 1576.

References 

Alumni of Corpus Christi College, Cambridge
Fellows of Corpus Christi College, Cambridge
Masters of Corpus Christi College, Cambridge
1576 deaths
Archdeacons of Sudbury
Clergy from Norwich